Devolution is the transfer of powers from a central government to a regional or a constituent national government.

Devolution, Devolve, or Devolved may also refer to:

Arts and media
 Devolution (album), an album by M.O.D.
 Devolution (band), an American industrial metal band
 "Devolution", a song by French electronic musician Electrosexual
 "De-evolution", an artistic concept and satirical "theory" of culture espoused by Devo
 Devolution, an album by De/Vision
 Devolved (band), a technical death metal band
 Devolve (EP), a 1990 rock album by Shihad
 Devolution (Brooks novel), a 2020 novel by Max Brooks

Other uses
 Devolution (biology), an evolutionary hypothesis
 Hindu views on evolution, including the Hindu devolution hypothesis
 The War of Devolution between France and Spain (1667–1668)